The Korea Automobile Association is an automobile association formed in 1969. Their purpose is to represent automobile drivers (consumers) and promote their rights and interests in South Korea. It is located in D-dong (Yongdap-dong), No. B, 70, Auto Market 1-gil, Seongdong District, Seoul.

References

1969 establishments in South Korea
Automobile associations
Road transport in South Korea
Road safety organizations
Transport organizations based in South Korea